Billy Rolland Cowan (born August 28, 1938) is an American former professional baseball player. Appearing primarily as an outfielder, Cowan totalled 493 games played, over all or part of eight Major League Baseball (MLB) seasons, for the Chicago Cubs (1963–64), New York Mets (1965), Milwaukee Braves (1965), Philadelphia Phillies (1967), New York Yankees (1969), and California Angels (1969–72).

Early life
Born in Calhoun City, Mississippi, Cowan grew up in Bakersfield, California, where he was a standout athlete at East Bakersfield High School. He attended the University of Utah and began his pro career in the Cubs' organization in 1961.

Baseball career
Cowan was promoted to the Cubs in September 1963 after three stellar seasons in the minor leagues. After smashing 35 home runs at two levels in 1962, he was selected the 1963 Most Valuable Player and an all-star of the Triple-A Pacific Coast League, pacing the circuit in runs batted in (120).  In , Cowan was the Cubs' starting center fielder, appearing in 134 games and starting 127 in the position. He also hit an MLB-career-high 19 home runs. But he struck out 128 times (second in the National League), posted a poor .241 batting average and led the Senior Circuit by committing 11 errors in center field. During the off-season, he was traded to the Mets for former Cub all-star outfielder George Altman.

Cowan was a utility outfielder, occasional infielder, and pinch hitter for the remainder of his MLB career, and spent two full seasons (1966 and 1968) back in the minors. He had success coming off the Angels' bench during his 173-game tenure, batting .278 with 13 home runs.  He retired after his final big-league game on April 24, 1972, when he struck out as a pinch hitter against Paul Lindblad.

Cowan's 281 MLB hits included 44 doubles, eight triples, and 40 home runs. He batted .236 lifetime.

References

External links

Billy Cowan at SABR (Baseball BioProject)
Billy Cowan at Baseball Almanac
Billy Cowan at Baseballbiography.com
Billy Cowan at Ultimate Mets Database

1938 births
Living people
Baseball players from Mississippi
Buffalo Bisons (minor league) players
California Angels players
Chicago Cubs players
Major League Baseball outfielders
Milwaukee Braves players
New York Mets players
New York Yankees players
Pacific Coast League MVP award winners
People from Calhoun City, Mississippi
Richmond Braves players
St. Cloud Rox players
Salt Lake City Bees players
San Antonio Missions players
San Diego Padres (minor league) players
Baseball players from Bakersfield, California
Tacoma Cubs players
Utah Utes baseball players
Wenatchee Chiefs players